Scott Berry (born July 20, 1962) is an American baseball coach and former catcher, who is the current head baseball coach of the Southern Miss Golden Eagles. He played college baseball at Crowder College from 1983 to 1984. He then served as the head coach of the Meridian Eagles (1997–2000).

Playing career
Berry played two years at Crowder College, a junior college in Missouri.  After two all-region seasons as a catcher, he was forced to give up baseball due to back issues.  He transferred to Southwest Missouri State where he completed his degree and became a student assistant coach.

Coaching career
In 1991, Berry was named an assistant at Meridian Community College, serving under Corky Palmer who would precede him at Southern Miss.  After six seasons as an assistant, which included Meridian’s first-ever JUCO World Series appearance in 1993 in Grand Junction, Colorado, Berry became head coach at Meridian, where he remained for four seasons, earning numerous coach of the year awards. His teams were ranked in the top 10 all four years he was at the helm, and placed 25 players at Division I schools and coached nine future professional players.

Berry then rejoined Palmer with the Golden Eagles, accepting an assistant coaching position at Southern Miss.  Berry worked in a number of roles, including hitting coach, pitching coach, and associate head coach prior to becoming head coach in 2010.  While a hitting coach, the Golden Eagles hit over .300 as a team after batting .279 the previous season, with seven players batting over .300.  As a pitching coach, USM posted the lowest ERA in Conference USA and produced four players who earned seven All-America awards, including one in four consecutive years.  In 2009, the Golden Eagles made their first trip to the College World Series after defeating Florida in Gainesville in the super regional round.  Berry ran USM's streak of NCAA appearances to nine with trips in 2010 and 2011, including a 2010 Conference USA baseball tournament title and a share of the 2011 regular season conference title.

Head coaching record
Below is a table of Berry's yearly records as an NCAA head baseball coach.

See also
List of current NCAA Division I baseball coaches

References

Living people
People from Neosho, Missouri
Crowder Roughriders baseball players
Missouri State Bears baseball coaches
Missouri State University alumni
Meridian Eagles baseball coaches
Southern Miss Golden Eagles baseball coaches
Place of birth missing (living people)
1962 births
Baseball coaches from Missouri